Admiral Sir Albert Percy Addison,  (8 November 1875 – 13 November 1952) was a senior officer in the Royal Navy. He was the Rear Admiral Commanding His Majesty's Australian Fleet from 30 April 1922 to 30 April 1924. During the First World War he was recognised by the British Admiralty as an authority on submarines, and his knowledge of that class of ship was used extensively.

Naval career
Joining the Royal Navy on 15 July 1889 as a naval cadet, he was promoted to sub-lieutenant on 14 March 1895, and lieutenant on 22 June 1897. He received specialised training in torpedoes, and was posted as a lieutenant (T) to the battleship HMS Victorious on 15 January 1901, as she served on the Mediterranean Station. After service on HMS Mercury, he was later promoted to commander on 31 December 1907 and later to captain on 30 June 1913.

He was appointed Companion of the Order of St Michael and St George while commanding HMS Dartmouth, during the pursuit of and engagement with Austrian cruisers in the Strait of Otranto which had attacked the Allied drifter line on 14 May 1917. HMS Dartmouth was torpedoed on 15 May 1917 by the German submarine UC-25 after the engagement but he successfully brought his ship safely into port.

Later while commanding submarine HMS E52, he led the action which sunk UC-63 (commanded by Oberleutenant Karsten von Heydebrec) on 1 November 1917 at Goodwin Sands, Dover Straits. For his war service during the Great War he was also appointed Chevalier of the Order of the Légion d'honneur and awarded the Croix de guerre. From April 1920 to March 1922 he was appointed Director of Torpedoes and Mining.

He became Rear Admiral Commanding His Majesty's Australian Fleet between 30 April 1922 and 30 April 1924. He was promoted to rear admiral on 2 November 1923. After his appointment with the Australian Fleet ceased, he commanded the Destroyer Flotilla of the Mediterranean Squadron. He was appointed a Companion of the Order of the Bath on 3 June 1924, and Knight Commander of the Order of the British Empire on 3 June 1931. He became the Director of Dockyards to the Admiralty from 1928 to 1937.

After retiring on 1 March 1929, he was recalled in September 1939 at the outbreak of the Second World War. He retired in April 1946, and died on 13 November 1952.

Notes

References
The Argus (Melbourne, Vic) – Friday 10 February 1922. p6. (online edition)
The Argus (Melbourne, Vic) – Tuesday 22 April 1924. p10. (online edition)

External links
Royal Navy (RN) officers 1939–1945

1875 births
Royal Navy admirals
1952 deaths
Chevaliers of the Légion d'honneur
Companions of the Order of the Bath
Companions of the Order of St Michael and St George
Knights Commander of the Order of the British Empire
Royal Navy officers of World War I
Royal Navy admirals of World War II
Military personnel from Portsmouth
People from Southsea